The Teatro Berga was a Roman theatre in Vicetia, modern Vicenza, Italy. It stood in an area beyond the  river, in what is now part of the historic centre of the city. Its site corresponded to buildings currently standing between Contrà Santi Apostoli, Piazzetta San Giuseppe, Contrà Porton del Luzzo, Piazzetta Gualdi, Contrà del Pozzetto and contrà Lioy. Contrà Porton del Luzzo follows the semi-circular route of the external perimeter of the south-facing cavea of the former theatre.

The theatre was built in the 1st century BC and it remained in use until at least the 3rd century AD. It remained intact throughout the medieval period, being used as a prison in the 13th century before falling into ruin. Its remains were documented by Andrea Palladio in the 16th century, and the building was mostly destroyed in the 17th century when it was built up as residential buildings. A few scant remains incorporated into these houses, and the general outline of the theatre are all that remain today.

History
The theatre was built around the end of the 1st century BC, and it was located in an area southeast of the city centre, beyond the  river connected to the centre by a bridge which stood on the site of the present Ponte San Paolo.

During the Julio-Claudian era, the theatre was enriched with further statues of members of the imperial family.

The theatre was used for performances until at least the 3rd century AD, and in fact it is mentioned in an inscription from Leptis Magna which recalls the honours paid by the theatre of Vicetia to the pantomime Marcus Septimius Aurelius Agrippa (he obtained decurionalia ornamenta, meaning decurion honours).

The first historical reference of the building consists of a diploma by Emperor Otto III dated 1001, with which he handed over ownership of the building to the Bishop of Vicenza.

The theatre was used as a prison in the second half of the 13th century, and it subsequently fell into ruins. In the 16th century, enough of the building was intact to allow Andrea Palladio to draw up a detailed plan, including dimensions that he measured personally. Other architects were later also able to draw up drawings of the theatre.

The theatre was destroyed in the first half of the 17th century, when its site was built up with residential buildings which still exist. The theatre's semi-circular plan is still evident, being preserved by the location of the roads surrounding it and the houses built on its site, but little remains of the structure. Some of the walls of the substructure of the cavea still exist, incorporated into other buildings.

Description
The Teatro Berga complex included the actual theatre in the southern part, and a vast porticoed area (porticus post scaenam) in the north.

It is estimated that the theatre could have held over 5000 spectators.

The theatre included multicoloured marbles and it was adorned with large marble statues depicting the imperial family of the Julio-Claudian dynasty.

The theatre was mainly built out of stone extracted from the Costozza quarries.

See also
Teatro Olimpico, a Renaissance-era theatre in Vicenza built by Palladio
List of Roman theatres

References

Bibliography

External links

Buildings and structures in Vicenza
Theatres in Veneto
Ancient Roman theatres in Italy
Buildings and structures completed in the 1st century BC
Buildings and structures demolished in the 17th century
Defunct prisons in Italy